SCL may refer to:

Computing 
 System Control Language, of the ICL VME operating system
 SC++L, the C++ standard library
 Software Collections in the CentOS Linux distribution
 System Command Language of the NOS/VE CDC Cyber operating system
 Structured Control Language, for programming PLCs

Language 
 Shina language, spoken by the Shina people in Gilgit-Baltistan, Pakistan

Organizations 
 SCL Group, a British data analysis and communication company
 Seattle City Light, public utility in Seattle, Washington, United States
 Southeastern Composers League
 Stanford Center on Longevity (SCL) Stanford University; see Stanford University centers and institutes
 National Senior Classical League
Society of Chief Librarians, former name of Libraries Connected, British public library organisation
 Society of Construction Law

Science and technology 
 Sculptor (constellation), astronomical abbreviation
 Serial clock, a signal in I²C electronic messaging bus
 Short circuit level
 Skin conductance level, in medicine
 Substation Configuration Language, for electrical substations
 Structural composite lumber, an engineered wood
 Semi-Conductor Laboratory of the Department of Space of India

Other 
 Comodoro Arturo Merino Benítez International Airport, Santiago, Chile by IATA airport code
 Seaboard Coast Line Railroad, by reporting mark
 Security characteristic line, plotting performance of a security
 Sha Tin to Central Link of the Hong Kong MTR transit system
 Studies in Canadian Literature, a literary journal

See also 
 Symptom Checklist 90 (SCL-90-R), psychometric instrument